The 1992 Belgian Masters was a professional non-ranking snooker tournament that took place between 28 October and 1 November 1992 at the Matchroom Schijnpoort in Antwerp, Belgium. James Wattana won the title, defeating John Parrott 10–5 in the final, and received £15,000 prize money. Stephen Hendry compiled the highest break of the tournament, 130, during his quarter-final defeat of Gary Wilkinson.

Wattana reached the final with three  wins. He was 1–3 behind in the final, before winning four consecutive frames. Wattana later led 7–4 and 8–5, and made a  break (102) in the fifteenth frame to win the match 10–5.

Results

First round

References

Belgian Masters
1992 in snooker
1992 in Belgian sport